JSL may refer to:
 JSL, Joint Station LAN, International Space Station
 JSL S.A., a Brazilian logistic company
 Japanese: The Spoken Language, a Japanese textbook
 JSL romanization, the romanization system used in the text
 Jamaican Sign Language
 Japanese Sign Language (ISO 639-3: jsl)
 Japan Soccer League
 JMP Scripting Language, a programming language used in the JMP statistical software
 Jonathan Stuart Leibowitz, given name of comedian Jon Stewart
 Journal of Symbolic Logic
Le Journal de Saône-et-Loire, a French daily newspaper
 Luxembourg Socialist Youths, a political youth organization